This is a list of fellows of the Royal Society elected in 1910.

Fellows

August Friedrich Leopold Weismann  (1834–1914)
Paul Ehrlich  (1854–1915)
Henry George Plimmer  (1856–1918)
Bertram Hopkinson  (1874–1918)
John Allen Harker  (1870–1923)
Sir William Boog Leishman  (1865–1926)
Gilbert Charles Bourne  (1861–1933)
Frederick Augustus Dixey  (1855–1935)
Sir Archibald Edward Garrod  (1857–1936)
Louis Napoleon George Filon  (1875–1937)
Arthur Philemon Coleman  (1852–1939)
Alfred Fowler  (1868–1940)
Arthur Lapworth  (1872–1941)
Sir Joseph Barcroft  (187–1947)
Godfrey Harold Hardy  (1877–1947)
John Theodore Hewitt  (1868–;1954)
Frederick Soddy  (1877–1956)

Foreign members

 Svante August Arrhenius (1859–1927) ForMemRS
 Jean-Baptiste Édouard Bornet (1828–1911) ForMemRS
 Vito Volterra (1860–1940) ForMemRS
 August Friedrich Leopold Weismann (1834–1914) ForMemRS

References

1909
1910 in the United Kingdom
1910 in science